The 2020 Los Angeles Gladiators season was the third season of Los Angeles Gladiators's existence in the Overwatch League and their third season under head coach David "dpei" Pei. The Gladiators planned to host two homestand weekends in the 2020 season, but all homestand matches were canceled due to the COVID-19 pandemic.

The Gladiators finished the season with 11 wins and 10 losses to claim the sixth seed in the North America region. On September 4, Los Angeles advanced to the season playoffs after 3–2 win over the Toronto Defiant in the North American Play-in tournament. In the first round of the North American playoffs, the Gladiators were swept by the Philadelphia Fusion, sending them to the lower bracket. They lost to the Florida Mayhem in the first round of the lower bracket, which eliminated them from the playoffs.

Preceding offseason

Organizational changes 
In September 2019, both head coach David "dpei" Pei and assistant coach Seetoh "JohnGalt" Jian Qing announced that their contracts lapsed with the Gladiators and were seeking other opportunities. The following month, JohnGalt signed with the Washington Justice's as their new head coach, while Pei signed a new contract with the Gladiators as their head coach and general manager. The team signed former Guangzhou Charge assistant coach Rohit "Curryshot" Nathani to their coaching staff in late October.

Roster changes 

The Gladiators enter the new season with three free agents, six players which they have the option to retain for another year, and no players under contract. The OWL's deadline to exercise a team option is November 11, after which any players not retained will become a free agent. Free agency officially began on October 7.

Acquisitions 
The Gladiators' first offseason pick-up was off-tank Indy "SPACE" Halpern, who they acquired from the Los Angeles Valiant on October 23. In early November, former London Spitfire DPS Kim "birdring" Ji-Hyeok signed with the team. Later that month, the team signed DPS Chris "MirroR" Trinh from Boston Uprising's academy team Uprising Academy and added former Mayhem Academy support player Nolan "Paintbrush" Edwards.

After the Gladiators traded off-tank Aaron "Bischu" Kim to the Guangzhou Charge in the middle of the 2019 season, Bischu re-signed to the Gladiators from free agency on November 15. A month later, on December 5, Los Angeles signed former Paris Eternal main tank Roni "LhCloudy" Tiihonen. The team announced their final signing of the offseason on December 12, with the addition of DPS Jason "Jaru" White from Team Envy.

Departures 
On October 18, the Gladiators agreed to transfer main tank Gye "rOar" Chang-hoon to the Washington Justice, pending approval from the league.

DPS João Pedro "Hydration" Goes Telles, who had been with the team since its inception in 2017, was the first of the Gladiators' free agents to leave the team, signing with the Houston Outlaws on October 18. Following him was DPS Lane "Surefour" Roberts, as he signed with the Toronto Defiant the following month. On November 25, off-tank free agent Kang "Void" Jun-woo signed with the Shanghai Dragons. It was confirmed on December 5, after the disbandment of their academy team Gladiators Legion, that two-way tank player Lee "Panker" Byung-ho's option was not picked up for the 2020 season.

Player trades 
The Gladiators' first player-for-player trade of the offseason took place on October 29, when they traded flex DPS Jang "Decay" Gui-un to the Dallas Fuel in exchange for main tank Son "OGE" Min-seok.

Roster

Transactions 
Transactions of/for players on the roster during the 2020 regular season:

On June 6, the Gladiators acquired DPS Josh "Sideshow" Wilkinson from the Florida Mayhem on a 14-day contract.
On June 7, the Gladiators transferred support Nolan "Paintbrush" Edwards from the Dallas Fuel.
On June 16, the Gladiators signed DPS Kevin "Kevster" Persson.

Standings

Game log

Regular season

Midseason tournaments 

| style="text-align:center;" | Bonus wins awarded: 0

Postseason

References 

Los Angeles Gladiators
Los Angeles Gladiators
Los Angeles Gladiators seasons